The Margaret River Pro 2016 was an event of the Association of Surfing Professionals for 2016 World Surf League.

This event was held from 15 to 26 April at Margaret River, (Western Australia, Australia) and opposed by 18 surfers.

The tournament was won by Tyler Wright (AUS), who beat C.Conlogue (USA) in final.

Round 1

Round 2

Round 3

Round 4

Quarter finals

Semi finals

Final

References

2016 World Surf League
Margaret River Pro
2016 in Australian women's sport
Sports competitions in Western Australia
Margaret River, Western Australia
Women's surfing